Etymological list of counties of Ireland is a list of the origins of the names of the traditional counties of Ireland, both north and south, including counties that are no longer used.

Unless otherwise state, the origin of a name is from Irish.

Counties

References

Irish toponymy
Languages of Ireland